William A. Graham Jr. Farm is a historic home and farm located near Denver and Kidville, Lincoln County, North Carolina.  The farmhouse was built about 1890, and is a two-story, three bay, rectangular frame dwelling.  The front facade features a large central gable with ornate gable ornaments.  Also located on the property is a two-story, 16-sided, "round barn" with a low, polygonal roof that radiates from an eight-sided blind cupola; log outbuilding; and a smokehouse.  The property was the working experimental farmstead after the American Civil War of William A. Graham, Jr. (1839–1923), son of governor and statesman William Alexander Graham (1804–1875).

It was listed on the National Register of Historic Places in 1977.

References

Round barns in North Carolina
Farms on the National Register of Historic Places in North Carolina
Houses completed in 1890
Buildings and structures in Lincoln County, North Carolina
National Register of Historic Places in Lincoln County, North Carolina